"The International Zone Coaster" is the third single from Leaders of the New School debut album, A Future Without a Past.... The song peaked at number one on the U.S. Hot Rap Singles chart in 1991.

References                 

1991 songs
1992 singles
Elektra Records singles
Songs written by Busta Rhymes
Leaders of the New School songs